is a passenger railway station located in Higashi-ku in the city of Okayama, Okayama Prefecture, Japan. It is operated by the West Japan Railway Company (JR West).

Lines

Station layout
The station consists of two opposed ground-level side platforms, connected by a footbridge. The station is unattended.

Platforms

History
Jōtō Station was opened on 01 November 1986. With the privatization of Japanese National Railways (JNR) on 1 April 1987, the station came under the control of JR West.

Passenger statistics
In fiscal 2019, the station was used by an average of 1456 passengers daily

Surrounding area
Higashiokayama Lake Town
Japan National Route 250
Okayama Municipal Jotodai Elementary School

See also
List of railway stations in Japan

References

External links

 JR West Station Official Site

Railway stations in Okayama
Sanyō Main Line
Railway stations in Japan opened in 1986